Kramgoa låtar 2001 is a studio album by Vikingarna, released in 2001.

Track listing
Att älska någon så
En gång till, om du vill
Jag sänder en tanke
De gamla
Lyckan kommer, lyckan går
Det var sommar
Låt oss fånga vår dag
Alla våra drömmar
Kärlek i blåa jeans
Du får mig att längta hem
Alla dessa underbara år
Let Me Be There
Min kärlek till dej
Livets trädgård

Charts

References 

2001 albums
Vikingarna (band) albums
Swedish-language albums